Llanrhuddlad is a village in the community of Cylch-y-Garn, Ynys Môn, Wales,  from Holyhead,  from Cardiff and  from London.

Geography
Llyn (lake) Llygeirian,  to the south-east, abounds in flora and fringing marshland. The Isle of Anglesey Coastal Path passes nearby.

Notable resident
The writer Morris Williams, a poet and theologist in Welsh, served as Llanrhuddlad's Anglican Rector from 1859 until his death on 3 January 1874. He completed a Welsh metrical version of the Psalms of David (Y Psallwyr, neu Psalmau Dafydd) in 1850.

References

See also
List of localities in Wales by population

Villages in Anglesey

cy:Llanrhuddlad